Hairshirt environmentalism (or hairshirt-green) refers to the idea that the environmental problems faced by society can be addressed by limiting the consumption of resources.

Etymology 
A hairshirt (or cilice) is an undergarment worn to induce discomfort, and thereby lead the wearer to spiritual purity, salvation, or atonement for sin.  Similarly, hairshirt environmentalism refers to the belief that denial of material comfort will lead to environmental sustainability.

Usage 
This term is often used in a derogatory way in reference to the anti-consumerism present in the environmental movement.  The central argument for this usage is that conservation alone will not be enough even if substantial numbers of people can be convinced to conserve, and that not enough people can be convinced to conserve for it to make a substantial difference.  It is also used by those having interests in promoting throwaway consumerism to accuse well-meaning environmentalists of stifling personal freedoms.  Famously, former Vice President Dick Cheney said "Conservation may be a sign of personal virtue but it is not a sufficient basis for a sound, comprehensive energy policy."

This term is also used by environmentalists who believe changes in technology, or society itself are necessary to make a substantial difference in environmental degradation, and that merely using less of the same technology within the same societal structure will not nearly be enough.  Bruce Sterling, in his final closing note of the Viridian Design Movement noted "Hairshirt-green is the simple-minded inverse of 20th-century consumerism. Like the New Age mystic echo of Judaeo-Christianity, hairshirt-green simply changes the polarity of the dominant culture, without truly challenging it in any effective way. It doesn't do or say anything conceptually novel – nor is it practical, or a working path to a better life."

In Sterling's case, this is clearly not meant to be derogatory to the environmentalist movement as a whole, but rather a challenge to think of transformative ways of changing our society's energy use – not merely gradual ones.

References 

Environmentalism